Nornes or Norane is a village in Sogndal Municipality in Vestland county, Norway. The village is located on the northern shore of the Sogndalsfjorden, just east of its mouth where it empties into the main Sognefjorden. The village of Fimreite lies across the fjord from Nornes. Norum Church is located on the east side of Nornes. Norwegian County Road 55 runs through the village, connecting it to Sogndalsfjøra and Hermansverk.

Commemoration 
In 1984, a memorial stone was unveiled by King Olav V of Norway to commemorate the 800-year anniversary of the Battle of Fimreite. The obelisk was erected in Nornes since the battle happened in the fjord between Nornes and Fimreite. At the unveiling, the historic play Slaget ved Fimreite and the composition Klokkesong (1984) by composer Arne Nordheim were performed .

References 

Villages in Vestland
Sogndal